John Doyle McQuade (June 4, 1895 – December 24, 1980) was an American professional football player who spent two years of the National Football League with the Canton Bulldogs. McQuade won an NFL championship with the Bulldogs in the 1922 season. He played college football for Georgetown University.

References

1895 births
1980 deaths
Sportspeople from Manchester, New Hampshire
Players of American football from New Hampshire
Canton Bulldogs players
Georgetown Hoyas football players
American football quarterbacks